Zulfiqar Ali Bhatti (born 1 October 1963) is a Pakistani politician who was a member of the National Assembly of Pakistan from August 2018 to February 2019. Previously he was a member of the National Assembly from June 2013 to May 2018.

Early life

He was born on 1 October 1963.

Political career

He ran for the seat of the National Assembly of Pakistan as a candidate of Pakistan Peoples Party (PPP) from Constituency NA-67 (Sargodha-IV) in the 2008 Pakistani general election but was unsuccessful. He received 66,392 votes and lost the seat to Anwar Ali Cheema.

He was elected to the National Assembly of Pakistan as a candidate of Pakistan Muslim League (N) (PML-N) from Constituency NA-67 (Sargodha-IV) in the 2013 Pakistani general election. He received 109,132 votes and defeated Anwar Ali Cheema.

He was re-elected to the National Assembly as a candidate of PML-N from Constituency NA-91 (Sargodha-IV) in 2018 Pakistani general election. In August 2018, the Lahore High Court barred the Election Commission of Pakistan (EC) from issuing victory notification for Bhatti after the runner-up candidate Chaudhry Aamir Sultan Cheema moved the ECP and challenged the victory of Bhatti. Following which the ECP ordered re-polling in the constituency.

On 2 February, re-polling were held in Constituency NA-91 (Sargodha-IV) in which Bhatti lost the seat to Chaudhry Aamir Sultan Cheema. His membership was consequently revoked on February 2019.

He successfully challenged the re-polling decision in the Supreme Court and his membership was reinstated on 4 November 2022.

References

Pakistani medical doctors
Pakistan Muslim League (N) politicians
Pakistani social workers
Living people
1963 births
Pakistani MNAs 2013–2018
Pakistani MNAs 2018–2023